Jaime Yzaga Tori (born 23 October 1967) is a former professional tennis player from Peru.

Tennis career
As a junior, Yzaga won the  French Open in  1985 and reached the semifinals of Wimbledon (also in 1985) and of the US Open (1984).

Yzaga played on the professional tour from 1984 to 1996, reaching career-high rankings of world No. 18 in singles and world No. 54 in doubles (both in 1989).

He was a quarterfinalist at the Australian Open in 1991, and at the US Open in 1994, reaching the final eight by defeating in back-to-back matches finalists of the previous edition: Cédric Pioline and Pete Sampras in five sets. Yzaga came back from a 2-sets-to-0 deficit against Pioline and 2-sets-to-1 against Sampras. At 5'7" / 1.70m, he was the shortest Grand Slam tournament quarterfinalist until Diego Schwartzman, also 5'7", at the 2017 U.S. Open.

He had earlier been the first-ever opponent of Sampras in the main draw of a Grand Slam tournament, in the first round of the 1988 US Open, also winning that match in 5 sets.

Since retiring as a player, Yzaga has served as captain of Peru's Davis Cup team.

ATP career finals

Singles: 11 (8 titles, 3 runner-ups)

Doubles: 3 (3 runner-ups)

ATP Challenger and ITF Futures finals

Singles: 1 (0–1)

Doubles: 1 (1–0)

Junior Grand Slam finals

Singles: 1 (1 title)

Doubles: 2 (1 title, 1 runner-up)

Performance timelines

Singles

Doubles

References

External links
 
 
 

1967 births
Living people
Peruvian male tennis players
French Open junior champions
Olympic tennis players of Peru
Sportspeople from Lima
Peruvian people of Basque descent
Peruvian people of Italian descent
Tennis players at the 1984 Summer Olympics
Tennis players at the 1992 Summer Olympics
Wimbledon junior champions
Grand Slam (tennis) champions in boys' singles
Grand Slam (tennis) champions in boys' doubles
20th-century Peruvian people